Robert L. Sufit is a professor of neurology at Northwestern University's Feinberg School of Medicine in Chicago and the husband of Judge Diane Wood of the United States Court of Appeals for the Seventh Circuit. Dr. Sufit received his Bachelor of Arts and Master of Arts in chemistry from Johns Hopkins University. He studied medicine at the University of Virginia School of Medicine and completed a residency in neurology at the University of Pittsburgh. Dr. Sufit studies peripheral nervous system disorders. He currently directs the Lois Insolia ALS Clinic at Northwestern Memorial Hospital, where he treats patients diagnosed with ALS.

References

External links 
 Neurology department at Northwestern University
 Lois Insolia ALS Center at Northwestern Memorial Hospital

American neurologists
Living people
Johns Hopkins University alumni
University of Virginia School of Medicine alumni
University of Pittsburgh alumni
Northwestern University faculty
Year of birth missing (living people)